Kingsauce is a "novelty-pop" project headed by Richie Chodes. They are considered to be an extension of The Elephant 6 Recording Company. Combining elements of mid-1960s pop, 1970s AM radio, and a touch of vaudeville, Kingsauce creates tunes with silly, tongue-in-cheek lyrics. Their last full-length CD Cancelled was released in August 2007. Chodes was also a member of Vince Mole and his Calcium Orchestra, headed by former Apples in Stereo guitarist Chris Parfitt.

Discography
 Ode to Lobo - December 1999 -7" EP on Happy Happy Birthday To Me Records
 Split single on Obtuse Records - May 2000
 Please don't change the channel - August 2002 - full-length CD release on HHBTM Records
 "Cancelled" August 2007 -Full-length CD on Little Pocket Records.
 Pacific Nature Recording Presents... 1 (Split CD with Iamb and Flatsound)
 "Chanukah Blues" December 2008 -EP on Little Pocket Records.
Link To Music: https://open.spotify.com/artist/1XLruOgRI20kcOHYH5Iy1b?si=8h_ZASp0SR-08epbrWXz-A

The Elephant 6 Recording Company artists
American pop music groups